Kim Eun-jung (born 1972), also spelled Kim Eun-joong, is a South Korean children's books writer.

Career
Kim was born in Paju, Gyeonggi-do in 1972. She won the Kim Man-jung Literary Prize in 2010 for her story The King of Thieves Welcomes a Thief. The following year, she won the 9th Pureun Literary Prize for her story Magic Trick, which was later published in the collection My Childish Father alongside contributions from fellow children's writers Shin Hye-young, Ha Eun-yu, and Kim Sun-young. Kim's next book, released in December 2011, was about a young protagonist Daepungi and his efforts to earn enough money to buy a video game console, and the conflict with his mother that results. The following year she released another novel aimed at pre-teens, The Day He Didn't Want To Write a Book Report, which was reviewed by the Busan Ilbo. Her most recent book, Special Mission! Let's Protect Ieodo, discusses the marine research station on the disputed island of Ieodo and encourages the young readers to take an interest in it.

Works
Note: English titles are unofficial translations only

The King of Thieves Welcomes a Thief [도둑왕이 도둑맞은 것]. 2010.
What Day Is It? [무슨 날이에요?]. Seoul: Daekyo Books [대교출판], February 2011. .
The Great Devil King Kang Yu-ri [잘난 척 대마왕 강유리]. Seoul: Blue Garden Books, April 2011. .
Magic Trick [마법을 부르는 마술]. In My Childish Father: 9th Pureun Literary Prize Children's Stories Collection [나의 철부지 아빠: 제9회 푸른문학상 동화집]. Seoul: Pureun Books, November 2011. .
The White Monster Goes Thud-Thud-Thud [하얀 괴물이 쿵쿵쿵]. Seoul: Daekyo Books [대교출판], September 2011. . 
Give Me My Money [돈조아마녀님, 내 돈 주세요]. Seoul: Blue Garden Books [파란정원], December 2011. .
The Day He Didn't Want to Write a Book Report [독후감 쓰기 싫은 날]. Paju: Gimm-Young Publishers, Inc. [김영사]. December 2012. .
Special Mission! Let's Protect Ieodo [특명! 이어도를 지켜라]. Seoul: Sangsuri, November 2013. .

References

External links
Works by Kim Eun-jung in the National Library of Korea catalogue

1972 births
Living people
South Korean women children's writers
People from Paju
South Korean writers
21st-century South Korean women writers